Arsenide iodides or iodide arsenides are compounds containing anions composed of iodide (I−) and arsenide (As3−). They can be considered as mixed anion compounds. They are in the category of pnictidehalides. Related compounds include the arsenide chlorides, arsenide bromides, phosphide iodides, and antimonide iodides.

List

References

Arsenides
Iodides
Mixed anion compounds